Sixth-seeded Emily Hood Westacott defeated Nell Hopman 6–1, 6–2, in the final to win the women's singles tennis title at the 1939 Australian Championships held in Melbourne.

Seeds
The seeded players are listed below. Emily Westacott is the champion; others show the round in which they were eliminated.

 Nancye Wynne (second round)
 Thelma Coyne (semifinals)
 Nell Hopman (finalist)
 Joan Hartigan (semifinals)
 Dorothy Stevenson (second round)
 Emily Hood Westacott (champion)
 May Hardcastle (quarterfinals)
 Sadie Berryman (quarterfinals)

Draw

Key
 Q = Qualifier
 WC = Wild card
 LL = Lucky loser
 r = Retired

Finals

Earlier rounds

Section 1

Section 2

External links
 

1939 in women's tennis
1939
1939 in Australian women's sport
Women's Singles